Olympiacos track and field department was established on November 16, 1953. The department has had in its ranks, through transfers, some of the best athletes in the track and field events in Greece including Olympic medalists as well as World, European, Mediterranean, Balkan and Pan-Hellenic Champions. Cases in point are Kenteris, Thanou, Iakovakis, Voggoli, Devetzi, Halkia, Maniani, Xanthou, Meletoglou, Dimotsios, Doupis, Polias, Polymerou, Papadias, Karastamati, Iltsios, Redoumi, Papagianni and more.

Honours

Men
 Open Greek Championships: 15
 2006, 2007, 2008, 2009, 2010, 2011, 2012, 2013, 2014,2016, 2017, 2018, 2019, 2020, 2022
 Greek Cross Country Championships: 12
 1965, 1966, 1967, 1984, 2003, 2005, 2007, 2008, 2009, 2010, 2011, 2013
 Greek Indoors Championships: 11
 2010, 2011, 2012, 2013, 2015,2016,2017, 2018, 2019, 2020, 2022

Women
 Open Greek Championships: 1
 2010.

Clubs championship
 Panellenic champions: 1
 2000.

References 

Athletics
 
Athletics clubs in Greece